Tradition is a short film by Sri Lankan female director and actress Lanka Bandaranayake, starring Irangani Serasinha.

The short film was selected to more than 50 international film festivals all around the world and won best short film (Student Jury Award) at 12th Jogja-NETPAC Asian Film Festival 2017 in Indonesia, Jury special award at 9th SAARC Film Festival, 2019, Sri Lanka, Best Cinematography at "Euro Kino" Czech International Independent Film Festival 2017 in Czech Republic and 2nd Best Film at National Youth Cinematic Harvest 2016 in Sri Lanka.

Story 
An old woman decorates a bride with the traditional Sri Lankan jewellery. She describes the symbolic meaning of each jewellery piece. Those meanings carry the girl to her past relationships and their deep scars. The bride's destiny seems something illusive.

Cast
 Kalum Gamlath as Girl
 Irangani Serasinha as Woman
 Sameera Lakmal as Boy 01
 Nilanka Dahanayaka as Boy 02
 Arunod Wijesinha as Boy 03
 Kalana Jayanath as Boy 04
 Anjana Premarathna as Boy 05
 Rajeev Ananda as Man

Festival history
 71st  Locarno Festival 2018, Locarno , Switzerland.   
 17th Imagineindia International film festival 2018, Spain
 14th IAWRT Asian Women's Film Festival 2018, New Delhi.
 Cannes Corner – 70th Festival De Cannes 2017 , France
 21st Toronto Reel Asian International Film Festival (Reel Asian) 2017, Canada
 20th Mestre Film Fest 2017, Italy.
 16th Ivy Film Festival 2017, United States
 15th jubilee of Filmfest Düsseldorf 2017, Germany
 14th VIS Vienna Shorts 2017,  Austria
 12th Jogja-NETPAC Asian Film Festival 2017, Indonesia 
 11th River Film Festival 2017, Italy
 8th Jagran Film Festiva 2017, India
 6th Chaktomuk Short Film Festival 2017, Cambodia
 6th Pachuca Film Festival 2017, Mexico
 6th ODA Tetova International film festival 2017, Macedonia
 6th FakeFleshFilmFest 2017, Canada
6th Festival of Nations 2018, Austria.
 5th GardenCity International Film Festival 2017-Bangalore, Karnataka, India
 4th Film Egypt Festival 2017, Cairo, Egypt
 3rd Warsaw Avenue Film Festival 2017,  United States
 3rd Equality Festival 2016, Ukraine
3rd Cefalù film festival 2018,  Italy.
 2nd Fiffen Film Festival 2018, Norway.
 2nd St. Francis College Women's Film Festival  2017 – Brooklyn Heights, United States
 1st New York Academy of Film and Music film festival 2017, New York, United States
 1st Cardiff International Film Festival 2017 – Cardiff, Wales, United Kingdom
 1st The Film Bunch 2017, England, United Kingdom
 1st GEOFILMFESTIVAL and EXPOCINEMA 2017, Italy
 1st Curtas do Acaso Film Festival 2017, Portugal.
 "Euro Kino" Czech International Independent Film Festival 2017,  Czech Republic – Best Cinematography
 5th National Youth Cinematic Harvest 2016, Sri Lanka – 2nd Best Film.

References

External links

Lanka Bandaranayake
Film Festival: Contemporary South Asian Films by Women
Ravaya news paper
Tradition: Survival Of A Soul With Scars
සම්ප්‍රදාය ගැන සම්ප්‍රදායික නොවූ කතාබහක්
 70th Festival de Cannes and the Sri Lankan cinema | Facebook
Exclusive: 'Not So Traditional' Interview With Lanka Bandaranayake
සම්ප්‍රදායට අලුත් කතාවක් ගෙනා ලංකා (video)
Info

Sinhala-language films
2016 films